The New Zealand Society of Actuaries is the professional body to which actuaries practising in New Zealand normally belong.  The society was founded in 1957 and incorporated in 1976.

References

External links
 Home - NZ Society of Actuaries

Actuarial associations